William Roy "wiL" Francis (a.k.a. William Control) (born January 8, 1982) is an American rock musician, record producer, author, and artist. He came to prominence as the lead vocalist and principal songwriter of the horror punk band Aiden.

Biography
Francis joined the original lineup of Aiden in 2003 as their bassist and replaced Steve Clemens as lead vocalist later that year. He became the creative force behind Aiden and, for the 2015 final album and tours, was the only member of the original lineup still in the band. During Aiden's hiatus from 2012 to 2015, Francis' primary musical output was William Control, and he has returned to this project full-time.

He has also released four albums (Hate Culture, Noir, Silentium Amoris, and The Neuromancer) under the name William Control, featuring a synthesizer driven darkwave, synth-pop style, as well as two live albums (Live in London Town and Babylon, two acoustic albums (Skeleton Strings and Skeleton Strings 2), an EP (Novus Ordo Seclorum), and a remix album (Remix). The fifth album, Revelations, has been split into four EPs: The Pale EP (October 2016), The Black EP (February 2017), and The Red EP (July 2017) and The White EP (November 2017).

Francis also acts as producer to bands such as Fearless Vampire Killers, A Midnight Tragedy and Ashestoangels, as well as producing his own William Control and Aiden music, and formed his own record label, Control Records. In May 2009, Kerrang! called Francis "one of the most enigmatic and talismanic frontmen in rock music today."

He has released two books of poetry (Flowers & Filth (with Lisa Johnson) (2009) and Prose + Poems (2011)), and three novels (Revelator Book One: The Neuromancer (2013), Revelator Book Two: The Hate Culture (2014), and Revelator Book Three: The Hell of Heaven (2016)). The latter two make up part of a trilogy. In spring 2016, it was revealed that a trilogy of films was to be made from the Revelator books. 

In 2018, Francis was accused of multiple rapes and the organization of a sex cult. According to accusations made by multiple women, Francis only purported to practice BDSM; in fact, they claim, he physically and emotionally abused women, ordered many of them to get matching tattoos of his initials, and even demanded contracts from his sexual partners or “slaves,” signed in their own blood. An excerpt from a pledge obtained by The Daily Beast reads, “My body is His to use in any way He should choose, and I will never object to any actions He chooses to perform, or have myself perform on Him. There is no limitation to what kind of pain I am willing to endure for my Master.”

Discography

Aiden
 A Split of Nightmares - split EP with Stalins War (2004)
 Our Gangs Dark Oath (2004)
 Nightmare Anatomy (2005)
 Rain in Hell (2006)
 Conviction (2007)
 Knives (2009)
 From Hell... With Love (2010)
 Disguises (2011)
 Some Kind of Hate (2011)
 Aiden (2015)

William Control

Studio albums
 Hate Culture (2008)
 Noir (2010)
 Silentium Amoris (2012)
 The Neuromancer (2014)
 Revelations: (The Pale EP) (2016)
 Revelations: (The Black EP) (2017)
 Revelations: (The Red EP) (2017)
 Revelations: (The White EP) (2017)
 Sex Cult: Volume 1 (album) (2021)

EPs
 Novus Ordo Seclorum (2011)
 The Pale (2016)
 The Black (2017)
 The Red (2017)
  The White (2017)

Acoustic albums
 Skeleton Strings (2013)
 Skeleton Strings 2 (2014)

Live albums
Live in London Town (2012)
Babylon (2014)

Remix albums
Remix (2014)

Other songs
 Deathclub (2009) - Underworld: Rise of the Lycans soundtrack
 The Posthumous Letter (2012) - Underworld: Awakening soundtrack

Collaborations

Guest appearances
 To Feel the Rain by On the Last Day, on the EP Wars Like Whispers (2005)
 Bleeds No More (live) by Silverstein, on their compilation 18 Candles: The Early Years (2006)
 Box Full of Sharp Objects (live) by The Used, during Taste Of Chaos 2007 (2007)
 Bleeding Rain by Vampires Everywhere!, on the album Kiss the Sun Goodbye (2011)
 Now That You're Dead by The Used, on the album Vulnerable (2012)
 We Join Forces by Mister Underground (2012)
 Voice of F.E.A.R. on the album Wretched and Divine: The Story of the Wild Ones, by Black Veil Brides (2013)
 Bury a Legend by One Last Shot, on the album Bastards of the Plague (2013)
 Pure Fucking Evil by Blood on the Dance Floor, on the album Bitchcraft (2014)
 Neon in the Dance Halls and City Falls to Dust by Fearless Vampire Killers, on the album Unbreakable Hearts
 Living Hell by Ashestoangels, on the album Horror Cult

Production
 The album I Tried to Make You Immortal, You Tried to Make Me a KILLER by the New Jersey rock band A Midnight Tragedy
 The EP Revenge by Seattle band Girl On Fire
 EPs The Ghost and Through the Rain by Seattle-based rock band To Paint the Sky
 The albums With Tape and Needles, Horror Cult and How to Bleed for English electro-goth punks Ashestoangels.
 The album Mile End by the Austrian punk band Stupe-iT
 The album Unbreakable Hearts for English rock band Fearless Vampire Killers

Bibliography
 Flowers & Filth (with Lisa Johnson) (2009)
 Prose + Poems (2011)
 Revelator Book One: The Neuromancer (2013)
 Revelator Book Two: The Hate Culture (2014)
 Revelator Book Three: The Hell of Heaven (2016)

References

External links
 Control Records Official Website

1982 births
Living people
American rock singers
Gothic rock musicians
Horror punk musicians
Musicians from Seattle
Writers from Seattle
21st-century American singers
21st-century American poets
21st-century American bass guitarists
Singers from Washington (state)
Songwriters from Washington (state)
Record producers from Washington (state)
Guitarists from Washington (state)
American male bass guitarists
21st-century American male singers
American male songwriters